Boronia rosmarinifolia, commonly known as the forest rose, is a plant in the citrus family Rutaceae and is endemic to eastern Australia. It is a shrub with many branches, simple leaves and pale to bright pink flowers arranged singly in leaf axils.

Description
The eight stamens alternate in length with those near the sepals longer than those near the petals. The style is glabrous.

Taxonomy and naming
Boronia rosmarinifolia was first formally described in a manuscript of Alan Cunningham. The description was published in 1837 by Stephan Endlicher in Enumeratio plantarum quas in Novae Hollandiae ora austro-occidentali ad fluvium Cygnorum et in sinu Regis Georgii collegit Carolus Liber Baro de Hügel. Cunningham collected the type specimen from Peel Island in 1824. The specific epithet (rosmarinifolia) is derived from the Latin words rosmarinus meaning "rosemary" and folium meaning "leaf".

Distribution and habitat
The forest boronia grows in wallum heath and woodland between Bundaberg in Queensland and Grafton in New South Wales.

Conservation
Boronia rosmarinifolia has been classified as "least concern" under the Queensland Government Nature Conservation Act 1992.

References 

rosmarinifolia
Flora of New South Wales
Flora of Queensland
Plants described in 1837
Taxa named by Stephan Endlicher